Jaisi Karni Waisi Bharnii (English: What you sow, you shall reap) is a 1989 Indian film directed and produced by Vimal Kumar. It stars Govinda, Kader khan and Kimi Katkar in pivotal roles.

Plot
Gangaram Verma (Kader Khan) is a man of ideals and a government servant. However, he is very honest and hates taking bribes. He lives in his ancestral house with his wife and son Vijay (Shakti Kapoor). Vijay is very ambitious and opposite to his father; he wants to get rich soon, for which he marries a wealthy girl Sapna (Shoma Anand) and becomes ghar jamai. Vijay's father-in-law, who is a builder wants to acquire Gangaaram's ancestral property. Vijay and Sapna manipulate Gangaaram and bring him to their own home. Gangaaram and his wife happily take care of their grandson Ravi (Neil Nitin Mukesh) and bring him up with good values. as Vijay builds a building on the property of his father, both Sapna and Vijay start showing their true colours. During that period, Ravi gets emotionally attached to his grandparents. As the story takes a leap, the young Ravi (Govinda) who sees his grandfather in a really bad state starts taking revenge from his parents just to make them realise their own mistake. Radha (Kimi Katkar), who is in love with Ravi also helps him in his drama of teaching a lesson to his parents. The story revolves around the concept of the proverb "What you sow, you shall reap".

Cast

Govinda as Ravi Verma 
Kimi Katkar as Radha 
Asrani as Datturam 
Kader Khan as Gangaram Verma 
Shakti Kapoor as Vijay Verma  
Gulshan Grover as Ranjeet
Neil Nitin Mukesh as Young Ravi Verma 
Shoma Anand as Sapna Verma
Dinesh Hingoo as Jokumal Makhumal
Rajesh Puri as Pyarelal
Kunika as Pyarelal's wife
Yunus Parvez as Phoolchand
Guddi Maruti as Bela Batliwala
Paintal as Maganlal

Soundtrack

External links
 

1980s Hindi-language films
1989 films
Films scored by Rajesh Roshan
Indian drama films
1989 drama films
Hindi-language drama films
Films directed by Vimal Kumar